The Nova Park is a property development project in Taipa, Macau.

Location
Nova Park is located next to Taipa Central Park, Nova Taipa Gardens and Nova City.

History
Nova Parks consists of three towers with 41 to 42 storeys offering a total of 620 units.

References

External links
Official Website

Buildings and structures in Macau
Landmarks in Macau